Henschen is a surname. Notable people with the surname include: 

Godfrey Henschen (1601–1681), Belgian Jesuit hagiographer
Helena Henschen (1940–2011), Swedish designer and writer
Lars Vilhelm Henschen (1805–1885), Swedish jurist and politician
Salomon Eberhard Henschen (1847–1930), Swedish doctor, professor and neurologist, son of Lars
Veronique Henschen (born 1988), Luxembourgian dressage rider